Drew Ellis may refer to:

 Drew Ellis (American football) (1914–1988), American football player
 Drew Ellis (baseball) (born 1995), American baseball player